Zou Yilin (31 August 1935 – 19 June 2020) was a Chinese historical geographer and educator who was a professor at Fudan University. He was a member of the 8th, 9th, 10th National Committee of the Chinese People's Political Consultative Conference. He was a member of the Association of Chinese Historians and the Geographical Society of China.

Biography
Zou was born in Shanghai, on August 31, 1935, while his ancestral home is in Shaoxing, Zhejiang. He secondary studied at Jinke High School, which was a private high school run by Catholic Church. In 1952, he was accepted by Shandong University, where he studied historical geography under Tan Qixiang. After university in 1956, he was assigned to the Institute of history, Chinese Academy of Sciences as a researcher. In 1962, he moved to Fudan University as an assistant, he was promoted to instructor in 1978 and to associate professor in 1980. He served as deputy director of its Institute of Historical Geography in 1982, and four years later promoted to the Director position. In 1994, he joined the China Democratic League and once served as a member of its 7th and 8th Central Committee. He died of illness at Xinhua Hospital, in Shanghai, on June 19, 2020.

Works

References

1935 births
2020 deaths
People from Shaoxing
Shandong University alumni
Academic staff of Fudan University
Chinese historical geographers
Educators from Shanghai